Out of Darkness, Shining Light is a 2019 historical novel by Zimbabwean writer and lawyer Petina Gappah. It was published by Faber & Faber in the UK and by Scribners in the US. The novel was nominated for an NAACP Image Award in 2020 in the category of Outstanding Literary Work and won the 2020 National Arts Merit Awards for Outstanding Fiction Book.

References 

2019 novels
Historical novels
Faber and Faber books
Charles Scribner's Sons books